Kenichiro Yoshida is a Japanese businessman who is currently the chief executive officer of Sony. He began this role in April 2018, succeeding Kazuo Hirai, prior to which Yoshida was the company's chief financial officer. Yoshida joined Sony in 1987, and worked across the company's subsidiaries in the US and Japan.

In the year 2000, he worked for Sony subsidiary So-net, which he took public in 2005. He rejoined Sony in 2013 as deputy chief financial officer and was promoted to chief financial officer the following year. In his role as CFO, he was credited with pushing the company through an extensive restructuring which turned around Sony's losses from consumer electronics.

References 

Living people
Japanese chief executives
Chief operating officers
Sony people
20th-century Japanese businesspeople
21st-century Japanese businesspeople
Year of birth missing (living people)